Henry Stone (1921–2014) was an American record producer and founder of TK Records.

Henry Stone may also refer to:

Henry Stone (painter) (1616–1653), English painter

Henry Stone, 1887 mayor of Shire of Hinchinbrook
Henry Stone (comedian) (born 1988), Australian comedian, writer, and director
Henry Stone, a fictional character in The Fugitive
Henry Stone (judoka) (1901–1956), American judo pioneer

See also

Henry atte Stone (disambiguation)